Arikkad Varghese (14 June 1938 - 18 February 1970), popularly known as Saghavu Varghese  (സഖാവ് വർഗീസ്), was an Indian CPIML leader, who fought mainly to protect the Adivasis in Wayanad from the exploitation of the feudal lords who were primarily members of political parties and the police system which then aided the exploitation, during the 1960s.

Arikkad Varghese is especially notable in the history of Kerala, for being murdered by the police in a fake encounter, and the truth of this incident which remained unknown for 40 years. After 40 years, the very policeman who fired the shot revealed to the world that he had murdered him, and called for a trial. In the course of the trial, the now-old policeman died before he could testify before the court. A colleague of his testified, and one senior police officer who ordered the murder was convicted and sentenced by the court.

CPIML leaders and activists who worked with Arikkad Varghese were Ajitha, and Grow Vasu.

Naxal life
Arikkad Varghese along with many others fought against the misuse and exploitation of illiterate adivasi people of Wayanad in 1960s. The Naxalites assassinated many landlords including Adiga, Chekku and distributed the assets gained from this landlords to the poor. The police tried to suppress it with power and by 1970 the protest was very weakened. On February 17, 1970 Varghese sought shelter and food from Karimath Sivaraman Nair. While he was asleep someone informed police and he was arrested. His body was later found at Koomparakuni near to Thirunelli police station. The Church refused to bury his body and he was later buried at his ancestral home at Ozhukkan Moola in Vellamunda.

Murder
Police constable P. Ramachandran Nair admitted publicly in 1998 that he had shot Varghese on orders of K. Lakshmana, then a deputy superintendent of police. A gun was planted on the dead body to imply that he had been shot dead in an encounter with the police. On 28 October 2010, in a historic judgement a special CBI court found former police officer K. Lakshmana guilty of compelling Ramachandran Nair to shoot Varghese and was sentenced to life imprisonment and a fine of ten thousand rupees.  The verdict was later upheld by the Kerala High Court.

Legacy
Varghese is often called 'Kerala Che Guevara', comparing him with the iconic Cuban communist revolutionary, because of the similarity of work he undertook for the underprivileged and the similarity in the circumstances of death.

In popular culture

The 2008 Malayalam film Thalappavu directed by Madhupal, has the murder of Varghese as its main theme. Malayalam actor Prithviraj played the role of Naxal Varghese in the movie

See also
 Thalappavu (film)
 Rajan case

References

 Keralakaumudi weekend February 2010, Story on Naxal Varghese
Supreme Court Observation on Varghese case

1970 deaths
1938 births
Communist Party of India (Marxist–Leninist) politicians
Indian communists
People shot dead by law enforcement officers in India